Kuh Kenar may refer to:
 Kuh Kenar, Ardabil
 Kuh Kenar, Sistan and Baluchestan

See also
 Kenar Kuh